The Kūrd are a Brahui tribe of Balochistan in Pakistan. They belong to the Sarawan group and speak the Dravidian Brahui language.
Josef Elfenbein contends that they are among the first Brahui-speakers to have come in contact with outsiders in the former Khanate of Kalat, as they appear in a certain oral tradition of the Persian-speaking Dehwars of Mastung District, where they are known as Kūrdgalla 'Kurd-people'. This term is likely to have been the source of Kūrdgāl, the name by which the Kūrd are known to the Baloch and the Jats, among whom it has been reinterpreted as meaning "speaker of Kūrd.

A proposed connection with the Kurds of Western Asia has been dismissed by Elfenbein as folk etymology that is implausible on account of the different vowels (long ū for the Brahui tribe vs. short u for the other).

References

Bibliography 

Brahui tribes